Marthe Enger Eide (born 17 November 1989) is a Norwegian sailor. She was born in Bærum. She competed at the 2012 Summer Olympics in London in the women's laser radial.

References

External links 
 

Norwegian female sailors (sport)
1989 births
Living people
Sportspeople from Bærum
Sailors at the 2012 Summer Olympics – Laser Radial
Olympic sailors of Norway
21st-century Norwegian women